

The Ahrens AR 124 was an American single-seat sailplane designed and built by the Ahrens Aircraft Corporation of California. Only two sailplanes were built.

The AR 124 is a single-seat sailplane with a cantilever mid-wing, an aluminium fuselage and a swept T-tail. The landing gear was a single unsprung nosewheel with a tailwheel and the single-seat cockpit had a one-piece moulded canopy.

Specifications

See also

References

Notes

Bibliography

Ahrens aircraft
1970s United States sailplanes
Aircraft first flown in 1974